Charles William "C. W." Kimmins (3 August 1856 – 12 January 1948) was an educational psychologist and was appointed chief inspector of the education department of the now defunct London County Council in 1904. He was appointed chief inspector at the education department of the LCC in 1904.

He was educated at Owens College, Manchester, University College, Bristol, and Downing College, Cambridge.

In 1932 he published The Triumph of the Dalton Plan with the educationalist Belle Rennie.

His wife was Grace Kimmins (Chailey Heritage, the Guild of the Poor Brave Things).

Family
 Grace Kimmins, wife
 Sir Brian Charles Hannan Kimmins (1899–1979), British Army general, elder son
 Anthony Martin Kimmins (1901–1964), actor, director and producer, younger son

References

External links
 
Chailey Heritage Hospital
"HAT THE FINNIEST (sic) PIECE OF APPAREL, SCIENTIST FINDS (Scroll down for snippet on page)
Petticoat Discipline Monthly: Christmas Annual 2000
 The rise and progress of the Dalton plan, reflections and opinions after more than  three years' working of the plan, by A. J. Lynch, preface by Dr. C.W. Kimmins.

1856 births
1948 deaths
British psychologists
People from London
Place of birth missing
Place of death missing
Academics of University College Bristol
Alumni of Downing College, Cambridge